Trevor J'Daniel Rogers (born November 13, 1997) is an American professional baseball pitcher for the Miami Marlins of Major League Baseball (MLB). He made his MLB debut in 2020.

Amateur career
Rogers attended Carlsbad High School in Carlsbad, New Mexico. As a junior, he was 9–2 with a 0.70 earned run average (ERA) and 122 strikeouts and helped lead his team to victory in the 6A state championship game.

Rogers committed to Texas Tech University to play college baseball. Considered one of the top prospects for the 2017 Major League Baseball draft, the Miami Marlins selected him with the 13th overall selection. Rogers signed with Miami for $3.4 million.

Professional career

Minor leagues
Rogers made his professional debut in 2018 with the Greensboro Grasshoppers and spent the entire season there, pitching to a 2–7 record with a 5.82 ERA over 17 starts. He began 2019 with the Jupiter Hammerheads with whom he was named a Florida State League All-Star. He was promoted to the Jacksonville Jumbo Shrimp in August. Over 23 starts between both clubs, Rogers went 6–10 with a 2.90 ERA, striking out 150 batters over  innings.

Major leagues
On August 25, 2020, Rogers was selected to the active roster. He started against the New York Mets, pitching four scoreless innings and allowing one hit. He made seven starts in 2020, going 1–2 with a 6.11 ERA with 39 strikeouts over 28 innings.

Rogers began 2021 as a member of Miami's starting rotation. He was named the NL Rookie of the Month Award back-to-back for the months of April and May 2021. He opened the season with a 3-1 record and a 1.29 ERA in five starts with thirty-eight strikeouts over twenty-eight innings in April. He followed that strong performance again in May with a 3-2 record and a 2.34 ERA in six starts, striking out thirty-eight batters. He was the first Marlins player to win Rookie of the Month honors since Justin Bour in September 2015 and the first Marlins pitcher to win it since José Fernández in July 2013. In July of that year, Rogers was named to the All-Star Game as the Marlins' sole representative. He finished the 2021 record with a 2.64 ERA and 157 strikeouts over 133 innings in 25 starts, despite a 7–8 record. He finished second in NL Rookie of the Year voting behind Jonathan India.

Personal life
His cousin, Cody Ross, played in Major League Baseball.

References

External links

1997 births
Living people
People from Carlsbad, New Mexico
Baseball players from New Mexico
Major League Baseball pitchers
Miami Marlins players
Greensboro Grasshoppers players
Jupiter Hammerheads players
Jacksonville Jumbo Shrimp players
Carlsbad High School (Carlsbad, New Mexico) alumni
Pensacola Blue Wahoos players